Concord School was a school for African-American children, built in 1894 and located in the hamlet of Miccosukee, in eastern Leon County, Florida.

History
The earliest mention of Concord School was in the minutes of a school board meeting from 1878. It was mentioned that the teacher's salary was $20.00 per month. Most likely the schooling began in the Miccosukee A.M.E. Church.

In 1893, two Miccosukee women, Fayette and Jennie Burned sold a half-acre of their land for $1.00 with the stipulation that a school house be constructed there. The first teachers on record were Lucien Fisher (1893—1894), A.B. Spencer (1895—1897). By 1912, Concord School had grown to be one of the five largest African-American rural schools in Leon County and was granted an assistant teacher. In the 1930s the school was enlarged and during the 1960s was combined with the Miccosukee School with the name remaining Concord. The school was closed in 1985.

Construction
The building is rectangular, vernacular wood framed architecture with one entrance and typical for a rural school in the South. It was unpainted and had neither electricity nor a well. It had two outhouses. The building was heated with a wood stove and lighting was provided by sunlight through the 6 long windows.

See also
 Station One School
 "Colored" schools in Leon County

References

Historic buildings and structures in Leon County, Florida
Historically segregated African-American schools in Florida
Defunct schools in Florida
History of Leon County, Florida
Educational institutions disestablished in 1985
Schools in Leon County, Florida
1894 establishments in Florida